Belfast is a hamlet in the Town of Belfast, Allegany County, New York, United States. The population was 837 at the 2010 census, which lists the community as a census-designated place.

Geography

Demographics

As of the 2010 census, there were 837 people, 337 households, and 213 families. The racial makeup as of 2010 was 95.9% White, 0.7% Black or African American, 0.2% American Indian and Alaska Native, 1.1% Asian, 0.2% from other races, and 0.1% from two or more races. Hispanic or Latino of any race were 0.7% of the population.

There were 337 households, out of which 34.4% had children under the age of 18 living with them, 45.1% were married couples living together, 12.2% had a female householder with no husband present, and 36.8% were non-families. 31.2% of all households were made up of individuals, and 14.9% had someone living alone who was 65 years of age or older. The average household size was 2.48 and the average family size was 3.12.

Ages were 30.5% under 20, 4.7% from 20 to 24, 24.9% from 25 to 44, 23.3% from 45 to 64, and 16.6% who were 65 or older. The median age was 37.9 years. The population was 46.7% male and 53.3% female.

References

Hamlets in New York (state)
Census-designated places in New York (state)
Census-designated places in Allegany County, New York
Hamlets in Allegany County, New York